Till Deaf Do Us Part is the tenth studio album by the British rock group Slade. It was released on 13 November 1981 and reached No. 68 on the UK charts. The album was produced by Slade. Although not as successful as We'll Bring the House Down earlier in the year, this album sold well.

The single "Lock Up Your Daughters" was a UK Top 30 hit  – the band opening the 24 September edition of Top of the Pops with it – and became a staple at Slade concerts.

Later in the 1990s, re-issues of the album on CD replaced the album's original artwork with a group photo.

Background

Following Slade's performance at the Reading festival in 1980, interest in the band was revived and the band were now able to fill concert halls once again. The band's 1981 album We'll Bring the House Down was also a success, reaching No. 25 in the UK, while the title track entered the UK Top 10. During the same year, the band continued their resurgence with the recording of Till Deaf Do Us Part. In May 1981, the band released the lead single "Knuckle Sandwich Nancy", however it failed to chart. The band had been confident that the up-tempo record was well-suited as a follow-up to "We'll Bring the House Down", but the band's manager Chas Chandler disagreed. The single was half-heartedly released on the Cheapskate label, with RCA handling marketing and distribution.

The band blamed Chandler for the single's failure and decided to manage themselves from then on, ending a twelve-year partnership. However, this did not stop Chandler from negotiating a major record deal with RCA for them. In September, RCA released the second single from the upcoming album, "Lock Up Your Daughters". It reached No. 29 in the UK. In December, Till Deaf Do Us Part was released as the band's RCA debut and first album of all new material since 1979's Return to Base. It reached No. 68 and a few of the album's songs quickly became part of Slade's live set, including "Rock and Roll Preacher" which became the band's new opener. In March 1982, "Ruby Red" was released as the third single, reaching No. 51 in the UK, while in April, "Rock and Roll Preacher (Hallelujah I'm on Fire)" was released in Germany, peaking at No. 49.

Shortly prior to the album's release, guitarist Dave Hill described the album to Sounds: "This album is a thumper and we want it loud. That's the direction we are heading for, like having a live show in the studio almost. It's got guts and melody. That is us really." In a 1981 fan club interview, Holder spoke of the album's title and general theme: "It came about because everyone always says how loud we are. We based the album around volume, all the tracks are rock and it is a loud album. The track Till Deaf Do Us Part is all about bending your ear and being deafened. We've used a lot of organ on the album. That's basically the only difference. We think that it's a much better sound than we've ever had before. It's a solid rock album from start to finish, except for the instrumental piece – which is a slowish theme, but all the others are fast and solid rock. There's no acoustic rock on the album like songs such as "Don't Waste Your Time" and "Sign of the Times," which we have had on previous LPs."

Song information

"Ruby Red" had been written around 1978 but the band felt their original recording of it did not meet their expectations. The song was further developed and then recorded for Till Deaf Do Us Part. "She Brings Out the Devil in Me" developed into a song from a lick the band used to play at soundchecks. Holder then added a melody and lyrics to the lick.

"M'Hat, M'Coat" was written by guitarist Dave Hill. Speaking of the song in 1989, Hill said: "It's just something I used to play around with when we were touring Europe and Jim said we should record it. So, we were in the studio and Nod was bashing out a few chords and really Jim rearranged it. We really recorded it on the spur of the moment and I think that's why it turned out so well."

"Knuckle Sandwich Nancy" has lyrics which refer to a real-life incident suffered by Holder. During a 1978 gig in Porthcawl, a bouncer became too aggressive with the fans, to which Holder told him to lay off. The bouncer later attacked Holder after the show, giving him a broken nose and black eyes. Holder would press charges and the bouncer was sent to jail for three months.

Critical reception

Upon release, Kerrang! felt that the album showed Slade's "old habit of writing classic material rekindled", adding that it was "uncompromising entertainment guaranteed." Melody Maker believed the band had "regained their confidence" and were "bigger and badder than ever". They concluded: "The album on the whole reaffirms Slade as one of our most enduring and uncompromising bands." Sounds felt the album "hing[ed] entirely on the lame pun of its title". They added: "Not only is the record boring and deliberately thick, but it doesn't even work on those terms. Slade sound dreadfully worn out, about as convincing as Alexander Haig on a peace march."

AllMusic retrospectively wrote: "Till Deaf Do Us Part is Slade's hardest-rocking album ever. Their playing is at its fiercest and the material totally kicks ass. Recommended for rockers." Joe Geesin of the webzine Get Ready to Rock! stated: "Till Deaf Do Us Part was another great set. Still classically Noddy Holder, but less cheese, not classic Slade but some damn good hard rock with that boot stomping Slade trademark. A very underrated period of the band's career." Q later listed the album at No. 16 on the "20 Most Painfully Punning Album Titles of All Time."

Track listing

Personnel
Slade
 Noddy Holder – lead vocals, rhythm guitar, producer
 Jim Lea – bass, keyboards, backing vocals, producer
 Dave Hill – lead guitar, backing vocals, producer
 Don Powell – drums, producer

Additional personnel
Andy Miller – assistant producer, engineer
George "Porky" Peckham – engineer (cutting)
Mark O'Donoughue – technician (tape operator)

Charts

References

1981 albums
RCA Records albums
Slade albums
Albums produced by Noddy Holder
Albums produced by Jim Lea
Albums produced by Dave Hill
Albums produced by Don Powell